The Ministry of Transport and Logistics (Arabic: وزارة النقل واللوجيستيك; Amazigh: ⵜⴰⵎⴰⵡⴰⵙⵜ ⵏ ⵡⴰⵙⵙⴰⵢ ⴷ ⵜⵍⵓⵊⵉⵙⵜⵉⵜ; French: Ministère du Transport et de la Logistique)  is the Ministry in charge of managing the transport and logistics sectors in the Kingdom of Morocco.

Historical overview 
The transport sector was created in 1912, as part of the services of the "General Direction of Public Works" in charge, during the pre-independence period, of the realization of roads, ports and railway projects, in addition to projects related to mining and telecommunications, etc.

The main historical stages that have marked the Ministry:

 1977: Separation of the transport sector from the Ministry of Public Works, following the creation of a Ministry in charge of Transport; 
 2002: Reintegration of the Equipment and Transport sectors;
 2013: The logistics sector joins the Ministry of Equipment and Transport;
 2021:  Creation of the Ministry of Transport and Logistics, following its separation from the Ministry of Equipment, Transport, Logistics and Water.

Missions and attributions 
Taking into account the powers attributed to the other ministerial sectors and to the institutions and bodies concerned in accordance with the legislative and regulatory texts in force, the Ministry of Transport and Logistics is responsible for the design and implementation of government policy of road transport, merchant marine, civil aviation, railways and logistics.

As such, the missions of the Ministry consist of :

 The development and implementation of government policy in the fields of road, rail and maritime transport;
 The elaboration and coordination of the implementation of the governmental policy in the fields of air transport, airport works and air navigation;
 The development of government policy in the field of road safety and coordination of its implementation;
 The establishment and execution of the government policy in the field of development of logistic activities;
 The establishment and execution of the cooperation strategy between the Ministry and the various actors operating in the sector and the examination of the means of developing cooperative relations relating to the Ministry's activities at the national and international levels. 

The Ministry may, within the limits of its attributions and on behalf of other ministerial sectors or local authorities or public establishments or associations of public utility or state-owned companies when they request it:

 Ensure the realization, the follow-up and/or the control of technical studies;
 Carry out technical works or ensure the technical control of works carried out by third parties.

Organization of the Ministry 

 General Secretariat; 
 General Inspection;
 Direction of Strategy, Command and Coordination with the modes of transport;
 Direction of Administrative, Legal and General Affairs;
 Direction of Information Systems;
 General Direction of Civil Aviation;
 Direction of Air Transport;
 Direction of Civil Aviation;
 Direction of Road Transport;
 Direction of Merchant Marine.

Establishments under supervision 

 The National Railways Office (ONCF);
 The National Agency for Road Safety (NARSA);
 The Moroccan Agency for the Development of Logistics (AMDL);
 The National Company of Transport and Logistics (SNTL);
 The National Office of Airports (ONDA);
 Royal Air Maroc (RAM) ;
 The Mohamed VI International Academy of Civil Aviation (AIAC);
 The Higher Institute of Maritime Studies (ISEM).

See also 

 Transport in Morocco
 Rail transport in Morocco

External links
 Ministry of Transport and Logistics
 Ministry of Transport and Logistics 
 Ministry of Transport and Logistics 
 Ministry of Equipment and Transport  (Archive)
 Ministry of Equipment and Transport  (Archive)

Government of Morocco
Transport organizations based in Morocco
Transport ministries
Civil aviation authorities in Africa
Organizations investigating aviation accidents and incidents
Government ministries of Morocco